Alf Martin Bjørnø (10 November 1923 – 2 August 1991) was a Norwegian politician for the Labour Party.

He was born in Brunlanes.

He was elected to the Norwegian Parliament from Vestfold in 1973, and was re-elected on two occasions.

On the local level he was a member of Brunlanes municipal council from 1951 to 1975. From 1963 to 1971 he was also a member of Vestfold county council. He chaired the local party chapter from 1966 to 1970.

Outside politics he worked in forestry.

References

1923 births
1991 deaths
Members of the Storting
Vestfold politicians
Labour Party (Norway) politicians
Norwegian trade unionists
People from Larvik
20th-century Norwegian politicians